Kehilat Nitzan is the first and only Conservative (Masorti) congregation in Melbourne, Australia. It was established in 1999 by foundation president Professor John Rosenberg, together with Itzik Yossef; both of whom had been active participants in the Masorti minyan at the Emanuel Synagogue in Sydney and were interested in developing a Masorti chavurah when they moved to Melbourne. From that initial meeting with 41 participants, the congregation grew to a self-sustaining kehillah of approximately 250 families.

Our rabbis have included Rabbi Ehud Bandel, Rabbi Adam Stein, and our current rabbi, Rabbi Yonatan Sadoff.

The congregation originally met at rented facilities at the Kadimah Jewish Cultural Centre in Elsternwick and at B'nai B'rith House in Balaclava. In July 2013, the congregation moved into its own building on Hawthorn Road in Caulfield North; foundation members Miriam Faine and Greg Shalit purchased and donated a parcel of land for the purpose. Services are traditional egalitarian and are led by members of the congregation. Friday night services are musical with much singing. The congregation uses the Conservative movement's Siddur Sim Shalom and Lev Shalem prayerbooks.

Kehilat Nitzan is affiliated with Masorti Olami, the World Council of Conservative Congregations.

External links
 Official website

Jews and Judaism in Melbourne
1999 establishments in Australia